Petros Bagalianis (born 6 February 2001) is a Greek professional footballer who plays as a centre-back for Olympiacos B.

Career

PAS Giannina
In summer 2022 he moved on loan to PAS Giannina, the main club in the city of Ioannina. On 12 January 2023 Bagalianis returned to Olympiacos B.

Honours
Olympiacos
Super League Greece: 2021–22

References

2001 births
Living people
Greek footballers
Super League Greece players
Super League Greece 2 players
Aris Thessaloniki F.C. players
Olympiacos F.C. players
Olympiacos F.C. B players
PAS Giannina F.C. players
Association football defenders
People from Chalkidiki
Footballers from Central Macedonia